MultiMarkdown is a lightweight markup language created by Fletcher T. Penney as an extension of the Markdown format. It supports additional features not available in plain Markdown syntax.

There is also a text editor with the same name that supports multiple export formats.

File format description
The MultiMarkdown language adds the following features to the basic Markdown specification:
 footnotes
 tables
 citations and bibliography (works best in LaTeX using BibTeX)
 math support
 automatic cross-referencing ability
 smart typography, with support for multiple languages
 image attributes
 table and image captions
 definition lists
 glossary entries (LaTeX only)
 document metadata (e.g. title, author, date, etc.)

Software
There are a series of open-source interactive and automated software tools for editing and conversion to XML, HTML, and LaTeX that share the same name as the format. Several other open-source and commercial text editors, such as Scrivener, also include broad MultiMarkdown support.

See also
Setext
Markdown
XML

References

External links
 MultiMarkdown

Lightweight markup languages